Jae may refer to:

 Jae (given name), including a list of people with the name 
 Jae (Korean name), including a list of people with the name
 Jae (author), German author
 JAE (Japan Aviation Electronics), a corporation specializing in the manufacture and sales of electrical connectors
 ISO 639:jae, code for Yabem, an Austronesian language
 JAE, ICAO code for Jade Cargo International, a defunct Chinese airline

See also
 Jae, Gyebal, a 2003 album by South Korean hip-hop duo Leessang
 Jae barb (Enteromius Jae), a species of ray-finned fish